Parnassius maharaja, the maharaja Apollo, is a high-altitude butterfly which is found in India and west China. It is a member of the snow Apollo genus (Parnassius) of the swallowtail family (Papilionidae).

Range
North-western India, west China

Status
Local. Not known to be threatened.

See also
Papilionidae
List of butterflies of India
List of butterflies of India (Papilionidae)

References
 
 
 
 
 Sakai S., Inaoka S., Toshiaki A., Yamaguchi S., Watanabe Y., (2002) The Parnassiology. The Parnassius Butterflies, A Study in Evolution, Kodansha, Japan. 
 Weiss Jean-Claude, (1999) Parnassiinae of the World, Hillside Books, Canterbury, UK. ,

Further reading
sv:Parnassius maharaja - Swedish Wikipedia provides further references and synonymy

maharaja
Fauna of Pakistan
Butterflies of Asia
Butterflies described in 1916